Juan Manuel Lucero Campos (born 26 May 1985) is an Argentine naturalized Chilean former footballer who played as a winger for clubs in Chile, Argentina, Paraguay and Brazil.

Career
Lucero played for different Chilean clubs such as Coquimbo Unido, Colo-Colo and Cobresal of the first division. In 2008, he was transferred to Club Olimpia of Paraguay. In Olimpia, he was a fan favorite due to his good skills.

He was transferred to Colón de Santa Fe in July 2009.

Personal life
Lucero naturalized Chilean by residence.

References

External links
 Juan Manuel Lucero at BDFA.com.ar 
 Juan Manuel Lucero – Primera División Argentina statistics at Fútbol XXI  

1985 births
Living people
Sportspeople from Mendoza, Argentina
Argentine footballers
Argentine expatriate footballers
Chilean footballers
Chilean expatriate footballers
Chilean Primera División players
Coquimbo Unido footballers
Colo-Colo footballers
Cobresal footballers
San Marcos de Arica footballers
Paraguayan Primera División players
Club Olimpia footballers
Cerro Porteño players
Sportivo Luqueño players
Argentine Primera División players
Club Atlético Colón footballers
Quilmes Atlético Club footballers
Campeonato Brasileiro Série A players
Associação Portuguesa de Desportos players
Primera Nacional players
Independiente Rivadavia footballers
Torneo Argentino A players
Primera B de Chile players
Deportes Iberia footballers
Association football forwards
Naturalized citizens of Chile
Argentine expatriate sportspeople in Chile
Argentine expatriate sportspeople in Paraguay
Argentine expatriate sportspeople in Brazil
Chilean expatriate sportspeople in Paraguay
Chilean expatriate sportspeople in Brazil
Expatriate footballers in Chile
Expatriate footballers in Paraguay
Expatriate footballers in Brazil